WREN-LP is a Classic Hits and Oldies formatted broadcast radio station licensed to Charlottesville, Virginia, serving Charlottesville and Albemarle County in Virginia.  WREN-LP is owned and operated by Genesis Communications. The station was formerly simulcast on WKMZ-LP 96.5 FM in nearby Ruckersville.

References

External links
 97-9 The Wren Online
 

2016 establishments in Virginia
Classic hits radio stations in the United States
Oldies radio stations in the United States
Radio stations established in 2016
REN-LP
REN-LP
Mass media in Charlottesville, Virginia